Wang Ying (born 18 November 1997) is a Chinese association football player.

Career statistics

International

References

1997 births
Living people
Chinese women's footballers
China women's international footballers
Women's association football defenders
2019 FIFA Women's World Cup players
Footballers at the 2020 Summer Olympics
Olympic footballers of China